Warren Township is the name of some places in the U.S. state of Pennsylvania:
Warren Township, Bradford County, Pennsylvania
Warren Township, Franklin County, Pennsylvania

Pennsylvania township disambiguation pages